"Whom Shall I Fear [God of Angel Armies]" is a song by Christian contemporary Christian-modern worship musician Chris Tomlin from his seventh studio album, Burning Lights. It was released in the United States on November 9, 2012, as the first single from the album.

Composition 
"Whom Shall I Fear [God of Angel Armies]" was written by Ed Cash, Scott McTyeire Cash and Chris Tomlin.

Release 
The song "Whom Shall I Fear [God of Angel Armies]" was digitally released as the lead single from Burning Lights on November 9, 2012.

Personnel 
 Chris Tomlin – lead vocals 
 Ed Cash – keyboards, programming, acoustic guitars, mandolin, bass, backing vocals 
 Daniel Carson – electric guitars 
 Paul Mabury – drums

Charts

Weekly charts

Year-end charts

Decade-end charts

Certifications

References

External links
 , official music video with lyrics; on its lower right there is a guitar chord diagram

2012 singles
Songs written by Chris Tomlin
Songs written by Ed Cash
2012 songs
Sparrow Records singles
Chris Tomlin songs